Percival Arnott (9 July 1889 – 23 December 1950) was an Australian cricketer. He played ten first-class matches for New South Wales between 1911/12 and 1912/13.

Percy Arnott was a director of Arnott's Biscuits. He died in December 1950, survived by his wife and their four married daughters.

See also
 List of New South Wales representative cricketers

References

External links
 

1889 births
1950 deaths
Australian cricketers
New South Wales cricketers
Cricketers from Newcastle, New South Wales
Australian corporate directors